Mossy Creek is a stream in White and Hall counties in Georgia, and is a tributary of the Chattahoochee River. The creek rises in White County and passes into Hall County approximately one mile south of the White-Hall county line.

Course

Mossy Creek rises in south-central White County, Georgia, south of Truett-McConnell College in Cleveland, and just east of U.S. Route 129. Mossy Creek continues east and crosses State Route 75 just south of Benefit, then turns southeast as it picks up another nameless branch. After another 2.7 miles traveled in a southeasterly direction, Mossy Creek is joined by two other nameless branches, then meanders southward for approximately 1.8 miles to its meeting with Dean Creek. Traveling 3.4 miles further through Rogers Mill, the creek flows into the Chattahoochee River in Mossy Creek State Park, approximately 2 miles south of where White Creek meets the river.

Sub-watershed details
The creek watershed and associated waters is designated by the United States Geological Survey as sub-watershed HUC 031300010302, is named the Mossy Creek sub-watershed, and drains an area of approximately 30 square miles south of Cleveland, and west of the Chattahoochee River.

See also
 Water Resource Region
 South Atlantic-Gulf Water Resource Region
 Apalachicola basin

References 

Mossy Creek (Chattahoochee River)
Rivers of White County, Georgia